West Coast Constituency was a constituency that existed from 1980 to 1988 in Singapore. It was formed in 1980 by carving out from Bukit Timah Constituency. In 1988, it was merged into Pasir Panjang Group Representation Constituency.

Member of Parliament

Elections

Elections in the 1980s

References 

Singaporean electoral divisions
Clementi